NGC 4070 is an elliptical galaxy located 340 million light-years away in the constellation Coma Berenices. NGC 4070 was discovered by astronomer William Herschel on April 27, 1785.  It was rediscovered by John Herschel on April 29, 1832 and was listed as NGC 4059. The galaxy is a member of the NGC 4065 Group.

NGC 4070 is also classified as a LINER galaxy.

Physical characteristics
Deep images obtained with the CAFOS instrument at the Calar Alto Observatory reveal that NGC 4070 has some deviation from a perfectly spherical or ellipsoidal shape morphology. This indicates that NGC 4070 has undergone a recent interaction, either with the galaxy 2MASX J12040831+2023280 or with a small knot of material. There also appears to be a faint, broad bridge of luminous matter between NGC 4070 and the neighbouring elliptical galaxy NGC 4066.

SN 2005bl
On April 14, 2005 a type Ia supernova designated as SN 2005bl was discovered in NGC 4070.

See also
 List of NGC objects (4001–5000)

References

External links

4070
038169
07052
+04-29-009
Coma Berenices
Astronomical objects discovered in 1785
Elliptical galaxies
NGC 4065 Group
LINER galaxies
Discoveries by William Herschel